The Butler BlueSox are a collegiate summer baseball team based in Butler, Pennsylvania, in the United States. They are a member of the Tri-State Collegiate League and were formerly a member of the East Division of the summer collegiate Prospect League.

History
The BlueSox were formed by former Pennsylvania State Representative Leo Trich, Jr. in Washington, Pennsylvania in 2006 as part of the Tri-State Collegiate Baseball League.  After renovations were completed at Kelly Automotive Park in 2008, Trich decided to move the Washington BlueSox to Butler as a founding member of the Prospect League.  The team officially became part of the league in December 2008.  The team went 28(W)-26(L) during their 2009 inaugural season in Butler.  In 2011 Leo Trich sold his ownership of the team to a group of five local business partners to run the team. MLB pitcher, and Butler native Matt Clement is one of the owners.  In late 2011, an agreement was reached to keep the BlueSox in Butler through the 2013 season.

2012 season
For the 2012 season, four additional games were added to the 56 game schedule.  The BlueSox went on to have a winning season for the first time since their inaugural year in the Prospect League, three years before.  However, they were a few games short of making the playoffs.

2013 season
The 2013 season consisted of thirty home games.  The BlueSox hosted the Prospect League All-Star Game on July 17, 2013.  The team was eliminated from the playoffs during the last game of the regular season, falling to the Slippery Rock Sliders 4–0.

2014 season
The BlueSox made their first playoff appearance in 2014 by going 25–7 in the second half of the season which included an 11-game win streak. They were eliminated by the Chillicothe Paints in the East Division Playoff 2–0 in the best of three series. BlueSox pitcher Adam Bleday (University of Virginia) was named Prospect League LHP of the year.

2015 season
Former BlueSox player and assistant coach Jason Radwan took over as the manager and guided Butler to a 33–27 record. First baseman David Marcus (California University of Pennsylvania) won both the Mike Schmidt Player of the Year and Roland Hemond top pro prospect awards. Marcus had a league best 11 home runs and 49 RBI. He finished fourth in the Prospect League batting title race with a .363 average.

2016 season
For only the third time in team history and the first time since 2011, Butler (29–31) finished with a sub .500 record. The BlueSox ended the season on a four-game winning streak including a sweep of Champion City in a double-header at home on the final day of the season, which eliminated the Kings from making the postseason. Outfielder Will Schneider (Morehead State) was a mid-season and postseason All-Star. Schneider had a .335 batting average with Butler, good for fourth-best in the Prospect League. BlueSox pitcher Connor Coward (Virginia Tech) tallied 68 strikeouts, which tied for second in the league.

2017 season
Under first-year manager Cody Herald, a Butler native and former BlueSox player, the BlueSox had a record-setting season, winning their first-ever postseason series when they swept the West Virginia Miners, 2–0. They also advanced to the Prospect League Championship Series for the first time where they lost to the Lafayette Aviators, 2–1. Third baseman James Meeker (Delaware), shortstop Pavin Parks (Kent State), outfielder Tanner Murphy (North Florida), catcher Brady Gulakowski (NC State) and pitcher Connor Coward (Virginia Tech) were named to the Prospect League East Division Postseason All-Star Team.

2019 season
The team announced in August 2018 that it would not participate in the 2019 Prospect League season. 

2020 season

On January 26, 2020, the BlueSox’s Facebook page posted that the BlueSox would return to play in the Tri-State Collegiate League. The team would play their first game back against the Youngstown Creekside Crocodiles on June 10, where they lost 7-6.

2022 Season 
In 2022 the BlueSox made the Tri-State Collegiate League Playoffs, and advanced it all the way to the Championship where they finished as runners-up. They were defeated 7-6 by the Creekside Crocodiles.

2023 Season 
For the start of the season the BlueSox will join the newly formed Rust Belt League within the Tri-State Collegiate League. They will be joined by the 3B Barons, East Butler Bulldogs, and Meadville Mustangs.

Notable alumni
Jacke Healey (2009)
Kevan Smith (2010)
Derek West (2017)

Seasons

References

Sources
Schnur, Richard Eugene, Men of Summer Return, Mechling Bookbindery., 2010.

External links
Official Butler BlueSox website

Prospect League teams
Butler County, Pennsylvania
Baseball teams in Pittsburgh
Amateur baseball teams in Pennsylvania
Butler, Pennsylvania
Defunct baseball teams in Pennsylvania